Thundering Herd: The Best of the Golden Palominos is a compilation album by The Golden Palominos, released in 1991 by Oceana Records. It contains two tracks from the band's first album, The Golden Palominos, and Visions of Excess, Blast of Silence and A Dead Horse in their entirety.

Track listing

References 

1991 greatest hits albums
The Golden Palominos albums
Albums produced by Anton Fier